Vilakkum Velichavum is a 1978 Indian Malayalam film, directed by P. Bhaskaran and produced by Pavamani. The film stars P. Bhaskaran, Prem Nazir, Sheela and Adoor Bhasi in the lead roles. The film has musical score by G. Devarajan.

Cast 
P. Bhaskaran
Prem Nazir
Sheela
Adoor Bhasi
Sreelatha Namboothiri
T. R. Omana
Bahadoor
K. P. Ummer
Seema

Soundtrack 
The music was composed by G. Devarajan and the lyrics were written by P. Bhaskaran.

References

External links 
 

1978 films
1970s Malayalam-language films
Films directed by P. Bhaskaran